Oribi Commando was a light infantry regiment of the South African Army. It formed part of the South African Army Infantry Formation as well as the South African Territorial Reserve.

History

Origins
Oribi commando was raised in 1979 and took responsibility for the area originally allocated to Charlie Company of South Coast Commando.

With the SADF
This area stretched from Karridene to Port Edward and inland to the Highflats area. Its headquarters was originally based at Winkelspruit.

A new headquarters in Marburg, Port Shepstone was occupied in 1980.

The commando consisted of the following:

 Alpha company: essentially national servicemen who formed the reaction unit
 Bravo company: volunteers from Umkomaas and Scottburgh
 Charlie company: volunteers from Hibberdene, Port Shepstone and Paddock
 Delta company: volunteers from Shell Beach, Margate and Port Edward

Reaction Force
This commando was home to a full-time reaction force for the southern part of natal and as a result the commando was essentially deployed on an ongoing basis during the period of unrest.

National Colours
This unit received its national Colours on 11 August 1990.

With the SANDF

Disbandment
This unit, along with all other Commando units was disbanded after a decision by South African President Thabo Mbeki to disband all Commando Units. The Commando system was phased out between 2003 and 2008 "because of the role it played in the apartheid era", according to the Minister of Safety and Security Charles Nqakula.

Unit Insignia

Leadership

See also 

 South African Commando System

References

Infantry regiments of South Africa
South African Commando Units